The national archaeological park of China is a designation created by the State Administration of Cultural Heritage (SACH) in 2009 to preserve and present large-scale archaeological sites. National archaeological parks must have previously been designated as Major Historical and Cultural Sites Protected at the National Level, and are considered to have high historical, cultural, and academic value. They include ancient settlements, cities and towns, palaces, temples and caves, engineering and manufacturing sites, and mausoleums and cemeteries. Many parks also have on-site museums.

The first 12 national archaeological parks were announced in 2010, and since then 24 more parks have been added to the list, bringing the total to 36. In addition, more than 60 sites have been designated as candidates for the national archaeological park status.

Regulation
On 17 December 2009, the State Administration of Cultural Heritage issued the National Archaeological Park Administration Measures. According to the regulation, an archaeological site must meet five criteria before applying for national archaeological park status: it must be a Major Historical and Cultural Site Protected at the National Level; its provincial-level government has issued and implemented measures to protect the site; an archaeological work plan has been approved and commenced; has an archaeological park plan in compliance with the protection measures; has a specialized administration entity with corporate status.

List of national archaeological parks
23 archaeological sites applied for the national archaeological park designation in 2010. On 9 October 2010, the State Administration of Cultural Heritage (SACH) announced the first batch of 12 parks whose applications were approved.

In December 2013, the SACH announced the second batch of 12 national archaeological parks.  In December 2017, the third batch of 12 national archaeological parks was announced, bringing the total to 36.

Candidate parks
In addition to the approved parks, the SACH has also given a number of parks the status of "candidate national archaeological parks". When announcing the first batch of 12 approved parks, it also announced 23 candidate parks, of which 11 were later approved in the second batch announced in 2013.

Jinyang City, Shanxi
Niuheliang, Liaoning (approved in the second batch)
Zhongjing of Bohai, Jilin (approved in the second batch)
Yangzhou City, Jiangsu
Yuyaochang (Jingdezhen Imperial Kiln), Jiangxi (approved in the second batch)
Nanwang Hub of the Grand Canal, Shandong (approved in the second batch)
Qufu, Capital of Lu, Shandong (approved in the second batch)
Dawenkou, Shandong
Luoyang of Han-Wei Dynasties, Henan (approved in the second batch)
Zhengzhou Shang City, Henan
Sanyangzhuang, Henan
Jinancheng (including Balingshan and Xiongjiazhong), Hubei (Xiongjiazhong approved in the second batch)
Tongguan Kiln, Hunan (approved in the second batch)
Liye Ancient City, Hunan
Laosicheng, Hunan
Jingjiang Princes' Palace and Mausoleums, Guangxi
Zengpiyan, Guangxi (approved in the second batch)
Kele, Guizhou
Chang'an of Han, Shaanxi
Xianyang of Qin, Shaanxi
Suoyang City, Gansu
Beiting City, Xinjiang (approved in the second batch)
Diaoyucheng, Chongqing (approved in the second batch)

31 candidate parks were announced together with the second batch of approved parks in 2013, of which 9 were later approved in the third batch announced in 2017.

Zhongdu of Yuan, Hebei 元中都 (approved in the third batch)
Nihewan, Hebei
Zhaowangcheng, Hebei 赵王城
Pujindu and Puzhou City, Shanxi 蒲津渡与蒲州故城
Shangjing of Liao, Inner Mongolia 辽上京
Salawusu, Inner Mongolia 萨拉乌苏
Jinniushan, Liaoning
Luotong Mountain City, Jilin 罗通山城
Shangjing of Jin, Heilongjiang 金上京
Helü City, Jiangsu 阖闾城
Lingjiatan, Anhui 凌家滩
Zhongdu of Ming, Anhui 明中都皇故城 (approved in the third batch)
Chengcun Han City, Fujian 城村汉城
Wanshouyan, Fujian 万寿岩 (approved in the third batch)
Jizhou Kiln, Jiangxi 吉州窑 (approved in the third batch)
Linzi, Capital of Qi, Shandong
Chengziya, Shandong (approved in the third batch)
Zheng–Han City, Henan 郑韩故城 (approved in the third batch)
Yanshi Shang City, Henan 偃师商城
Chengyang City, Henan 城阳城址
Tonglüshan, Hubei 铜绿山
Longwan, Hubei 龙湾
Panlongcheng, Hubei (approved in the third batch)
Tanheli, Hunan 炭河里
Chengtoushan, Hunan (approved in the third batch)
Taihe City, Yunnan 太和城
Tongwancheng, Shaanxi
Longgangsi, Shaanxi 龙岗寺
Dadiwan, Gansu 大地湾
Western Xia Mausoleums, Ningxia (approved in the third batch)
Lajia, Qinghai

In December 2017, 32 candidate parks were announced together with the third batch of approved parks.

Capital of the Zhongshan Kingdom, Hebei
Yecheng, Hebei
Taosi, Shanxi
Tuchengzi, Inner Mongolia
Mopancun Mountain City, Jilin
Longqiuzhuang, Jiangsu
Majiabang, Zhejiang
Anji Ancient City and Longshan Yue Cemetery, Zhejiang
Shouchun City, Anhui
Shuangdun, Bengbu, Anhui
Yuhuicun, Anhui
Wucheng, Jiangxi
Marquisate of Haihun, Jiangxi
Liangchengzhen, Shandong
Yangshao, Henan
Erlitou, Henan
Jiahu, Henan
Miaodigou, Henan
Dahecun, Henan
Qujialing, Hubei
Shijiahe, Hubei
Sujialong 苏家垄, Hubei
Bijiashan Chaozhou Kiln, Guangdong
Tomb of Francis Xavier and Dazhouwan, Guangdong
Hepu Han City and Cemetery, Guangxi
Qiong Kiln, Sichuan
Qianling Mausoleum, Shaanxi
Epang Palace, Shaanxi
Zhouyuan, Shaanxi
Duling Mausoleum, Shaanxi
Shimao, Shaanxi
Subashi Temple, Xinjiang

See also
China's 100 major archaeological discoveries in the 20th century

References